The 2018 Latvian Higher League was the 27th season of top-tier football in Latvia. Spartaks Jūrmala were the defending champions, having won their second title in the previous season.

Teams

At the end of the 2017 season, Babīte were excluded from the league due to match-fixing. This resulted in METTA/LU ending up as the bottom-placed team. They were sent to the relegation playoffs against FK Progress/AFA Olaine. METTA/LU won, keeping them in the Latvian Higher League. 

Babīte were replaced by the champions of the 2017 Latvian First League, Valmieras FK.

Source: Scoresway

Kits manufacturer and sponsors

League table

Results
Each team played the other seven teams home-and-away twice, for a total of 28 games each.

Relegation play-offs
The seventh-placed team from the 2018 Higher League faced the runners-up of the 2018 Latvian First League in a two-legged play-off. The winner, METTA/LU, earned the right to participate in the 2019 Higher League.

Top scorers

References

External links
 

Latvian Higher League seasons
1
Latvia
Latvia